Events in the year 1941 in Bulgaria.

Incumbents 
Monarch – Boris III

Events 

 March 1 – Bulgaria joined the Axis.

References 

 
1940s in Bulgaria
Years of the 20th century in Bulgaria
Bulgaria
Bulgaria